CTD may refer to:

Medicine
 Carnitine transporter deficiency, an inborn error of fatty acid transport
 Comparative Toxicogenomics Database, an online research tool describing chemical-gene-disease interactions
 CTD (chemotherapy), a combination of the drugs cyclophosphamide, thalidomide, and dexamethasone
 Common Technical Document, an internationally agreed format for  drug approvals
 Connective tissue disease
 Circling the Drain, acronym relating to those on the way out

Music
Crash Test Dummies, a Canadian rock band from Winnipeg, Manitoba

Science
 Comparative Toxicogenomics Database, an online research tool describing chemical-gene-disease interactions
 CTD (instrument), in oceanography, used to determine conductivity, temperature, and depth
 Carboxy-Terminal Domain, the end of an amino acid chain which has specialized functions in some proteins
 Church–Turing–Deutsch principle, in computer science, relates to the universality of simulation

IT (Information Technology)
 Crash to desktop
 Continuous Threat Detection

Other
 CBS Television Distribution
 Central de Trabajadores Democráticos, a trade union centre in El Salvador
 Continued, a word
 Counter Terrorism Department, Pakistani agency for counter terrorism
 FBI Counterterrorism Division, the United States Federal Bureau of Investigation's anti-terrorism division
 Cummins Turbo Diesel, acronym for an engine genre